Magnetic Resonance Imaging is a peer-reviewed scientific journal published by Elsevier, encompassing biology, physics, and clinical science as they relate to the development and use of magnetic resonance imaging technology. Magnetic Resonance Imaging was established in 1982 and the current editor-in-chief is John C. Gore. The journal produces 10 issues per year.

External links
 

Elsevier academic journals
Radiology and medical imaging journals
Publications established in 1982
English-language journals
10 times per year journals